Patrick Kevin Skinner (born February 25, 1974) is an American country music singer from the Jackson Purchase region of Kentucky. He is the winner of the fourth season of America's Got Talent.

Early life and career 
Skinner is from the Dublin community of Graves County, Kentucky, and started playing the guitar when he was 12 years old. He has been playing, writing, and singing ever since he learned the art of music from his musician father, Joe, who is a fan of Hank Williams. Skinner is divorced and has two children, a daughter and a son. He has worked as a chicken catcher for several years and claims to have caught with his friends up to 60,000 chickens in one night.

America's Got Talent

Audition 
Skinner performed in a live audition on the August 4, 2009 episode of America's Got Talent. He became a fan favorite in the show after his performance of Garth Brooks' "If Tomorrow Never Comes" while strumming his guitar. Judges Piers Morgan, Sharon Osbourne, and David Hasselhoff all voted "Yes", sending him to the Vegas Round.

Vegas Round 
Skinner then appeared without performing in the Vegas Round. His audition was strong enough for the judges to send him to the Quarterfinals in Episode 411.

Quarterfinals 
His Week 1 Quarterfinals performance in Episode 413 consisted of singing Bob Dylan's "Make You Feel My Love" while playing the guitar. Kevin received enough votes to be sent to the Semifinals in Episode 414 instead of Mosaic.

Semifinals 
The Week 1 Semifinals performance in Episode 421 consisted of Skinner guitar playing and singing "Always On My Mind" by Brenda Lee. Piers Morgan gave him a standing ovation, saying that singing from the heart and soul with real, raw emotion is the whole story about him while the two of them were both teary-eyed as well as the audience, in which Kevin was reminded that he had the ability to move an audience in a way that Piers never saw on AGT before concluding that Kevin is one of his favorites to win the season.

In the end, Kevin received enough votes to be sent to the Finals in Episode 422 instead of Acrodunk basketball trampoline dance group.

Finals 
Later in the Finals, Skinner's performance in Episode 425 consisted of singing his rendition of Aerosmith's "I Don't Want to Miss a Thing" while playing his guitar and having a backup band and vocals.

Judge Piers said the rendition wasn't perfect and had a missed odd note with little flattened places, but described the moment as the point of Skinner's journey as a "rough diamond", needing professional training. But remembering the words on how Hasselhoff described Skinner, Piers said that he was what the show was created for while being unemployed and catching chickens the past year at that time. But despite those obstacles, it was a better way for America itself to get out of its recession and have Skinner compete in the show.

Even though Sharon said that he doesn't have the best voice in the contest, she reminded Kevin that he does not need to sound perfect while describing him as one of the greatest and unique icons, similar to Johnny Cash, Bob Dylan, Mick Jagger and Lou Reed, all of whom did not need to have the perfect voices but are all such unique individuals.

The judges once again all gave him standing ovations.

Finale 
Kevin Skinner received enough votes to be included in the Top 5 in Episode 426 instead of Drew Stevyns. Kevin was revealed to have competed in first place in the competition that same night, in front of Barbara Padilla who was runner up, Recycled Percussion in third place, The Texas Tenors in fourth, and The Voices of Glory in fifth, winning one million dollars and a headline show in Las Vegas.

Trivia 
During AGT's 10 Year Anniversary Special on July 29, 2015, Piers Morgan stated that Kevin Skinner was his favorite act.

Performances/results

Post-Talent 
Kevin received the $1 million prize, which was put into an annuity so it will be paid out over 40 years, and a headline show in Las Vegas, premiering in October 2009 and hosted by Jerry Springer. He performed "If Tomorrow Never Comes" on The Tonight Show with Conan O'Brien on September 17, 2009 and in October of that year, he performed on The Ellen DeGeneres Show and later on Live with Kelly and Ryan.

Career

Long Ride (2010–present) 
His debut CD, "Long Ride" was released on his namesake Saint Patrick's Day, March 17, 2010. The album was released online six months later on September 14.

Discography

Albums

Singles

Music videos

References 

1974 births
Living people
21st-century American singers
People from Mayfield, Kentucky
Country musicians from Kentucky
America's Got Talent winners
American country singer-songwriters
American male singer-songwriters
Singer-songwriters from Kentucky
21st-century American guitarists
Guitarists from Kentucky
American male guitarists
21st-century American male singers